Christopher Charles Corbould,  (born 1958) is a British special effects coordinator best known for his work on major blockbuster films and the action scenes on 15 James Bond films since The Spy Who Loved Me. He has also worked extensively on the Superman and Batman film series on digital effects and stunts. Corbould has been awarded two Honorary Doctorates from Southampton Solent University in December 2009 and University of Hertfordshire in 2011. In 2011, he won the Academy Award for Best Visual Effects at the 83rd Academy Awards for his work on Inception. He is the brother of special effects supervisors Neil Corbould and Paul Corbould.

In March 2011, Corbould went on trial for breaching health and safety regulations regarding the death of stunt technician Conway Wickliffe during production of The Dark Knight in 2007. He was found not guilty, with the incident ruled as an accident.

Corbould was appointed Officer of the Order of the British Empire (OBE) in the 2014 New Year Honours for services to film.

In 2015, Corbould was credited with Guinness World Records for the "Largest film stunt explosion" ever in cinematic history for Spectre. In 2021, this was then surpassed once again by Chris for No Time to Die, a total of 136.4 kg TNT was used.

Special effects filmography

Arms

References

External links
 

1958 births
Alumni of Solent University
Best Visual Effects Academy Award winners
Best Visual Effects BAFTA Award winners
British film people
Living people
Officers of the Order of the British Empire
Special effects coordinators